Indian Island is a small island of the U.S. state of Michigan, located at the north end of Maumee Bay in Lake Erie. It is located just off shore of the northeast tip of the "Lost Peninsula", an exclave created by the Michigan-Ohio boundary line.  It is part of Erie Township in Monroe County.

It was never known to have been inhabited.  On older USGS topographic maps, it was labeled (possibly erroneously) as "Odeen Island", while an island nearby to the west was referred to as "Indian Island".

References

Islands of Monroe County, Michigan
Islands of Lake Erie in Michigan